Gayford is a surname. Notable people with the surname include:

Christopher Gayford (born 1963), English music conductor
Clarke Gayford (born 1977), New Zealand radio and television broadcaster 
Thomas Gayford (born 1928), Canadian equestrian

English-language surnames